Provazník is a very common Czech surname. The feminine form is Provazníková. Literally, it means "rope-maker".

It may mean:
 Alois Provazník (1856–1938), composer
 Anatol Provazník (1887–1950), composer, son of Alois
 František Provazník (born 1948), rower

Czech-language surnames